Passion Play is a 1981 play by British playwright Peter Nichols dealing with adultery and betrayal, unusual in that the two leading characters are each portrayed by two actors for public speech and private thoughts.

It was originally intended to open the Royal Shakespeare Company's new Barbican Theatre but was produced by them at the London's Aldwych Theatre in 1981.

It was revived at the Leicester Haymarket Theatre in 1984 before transferring to Wyndham's Theatre, at the Donmar Warehouse in 2000 before transferring to the Comedy Theatre, and at the Duke of York's Theatre in 2013.

Dramatis Personae and Casts

London Stagings

Broadway

It opened, as Passion, on Broadway at the Longacre Theatre on 7 May 1983, where it closed on 8 August 1983 after 97 performances. The Broadway production was directed by Marshall W. Mason and starred Cathryn Damon as Eleanor, Frank Langella as Jim, Stephanie Gordon as Agnes, Bob Gunton as James, Roxanne Hart as Kate, and E. Katherine Kerr as Nell.

References

External links
 

Plays by Peter Nichols
1981 plays